The 1876–77 season was the sixth season of competitive football in England.

National team

Once again England played Scotland at the Kennington Oval This was England's first defeat on 'home soil'. The referee for this match was former England player, Robert Ogilvie.

Honours

Notes = Number in parentheses is the times that club has won that honour. * indicates new record for competition

Events
First edition of the Birmingham Senior Cup, the earliest Association competition on a local level, takes place, won by Wednesbury Old Athletic F.C.
First edition of the Sheffield & Hallamshire Senior Cup, at that time played to the Sheffield rules, takes place, won by The Wednesday.

References

External links